Rebekah Brandes (born June 28, 1985) is an American born film and television actress and writer. She was born in Detroit, Michigan, United States, and has appeared in 14 films — the first, in 2005, was Slaughter Party and the most recent, in 2016, was Barrio Tales 2.

Biography
Notable projects include Bellflower, in which her performance as Courtney, "a nymphet with a .45" garnered positive reviews by like the likes of  Variety and Paste, Nothing Left to Fear, in which The New York Times recognized her as having "Charm", produced and scored by Slash of Guns N' Roses, and Midnight Movie. She has also appeared on television shows NCIS, Criminal Minds, Greek and the series The Forgotten starring Christian Slater. She attended the renowned American Academy of Dramatic Arts. She graduated summa cum laude from the University of California, Los Angeles, where she majored in English literature and minored in professional writing. 

She is also a freelance writer and editor. Her writing has been published in MAD Magazine, Trill! Magazine, Los Angeles Magazine, and BuzzFeed.

Early life 
Brandes was born in Royal Oak, Michigan. She is the only daughter of Elaine Katz, an artist, and Wayne Brandes, a physician. She has three brothers.

References

External links

Rebekah Brandes, Author at Los Angeles Magazine
Rebekah Brandes, Author at Trill! Magazine

Living people
1985 births
Actresses from Detroit
21st-century American women